Blakes Estate Stadium, is a soccer stadium in Montserrat, near the village of Look Out. The stadium holds 1,000. On 2 April 2002, the officially named MFA Inc. Complex was completed using FIFA funds.

Tenants
Blakes Estate Stadium has several tenants and many of the teams in the Montserrat Championship use it for their league games. Montserrat National Team play their international fixtures there as well, where the team had never lost a game until a last minute defeat to El Salvador in September 2018. Other tenants include Ideal SC, Royal Montserrat Police Force, etc.

Football venues in Montserrat
Brades